Plaue (Thür) station is a junction station in the town of Plaue in the German state of Thuringia.

It lies at the junction of the Erfurt–Würzburg and Erfurt–Ilmenau(–Themar) railways. The line is double-track towards Erfurt, but the lines towards Würzburg and Ilmenau are single-track.

Originally the section in the Brandleite Tunnel between the stations of Gehlberg and Oberhof line to Würzburg was double-track. After the Second World War, the second track of the section of the Neudietendorf–Meiningen on the line in the Brandleite Tunnel between the stations of Gehlberg and Oberhofon was dismantled for reparations to the Soviet Union. At the beginning of the 1980s, the heavily used Neudietendorf–Plaue railway was redoubled and electrification was extended to Arnstadt, but the overhead wire was dismantled after the reunification of Germany. The planned further electrification failed because the GDR was not able to build a power station to supply the railway.

Freight operations at Plaue station ended in the 1970s. The siding to Dosdorf brickyard was also closed and dismantled during this time. Shunting operations were discontinued in the 1980s and the tracks to the freight shed were dismantled. However, it was still possible to consign even bulky goods on DR. These were loaded into wagons attached to passenger trains. From the 1990s onwards, the railway tracks were rebuilt several times. Of the original ten tracks in the station, only three now exist.

The station is located in the east of the town centre between Plaue and Kleinbreitenbach. It has three platforms: platform 1 is used by trains to Würzburg, platform 2 is used by trains to Erfurt and platform 3 is used by trains to Ilmenau, Würzburg and Erfurt. Platforms 2 and 3 are accessible via an underpass.

The following services serve Plaue station:
RE 7 (Mainfranken-Thüringen-Express) Erfurt Hbf–Arnstadt Hbf–Plaue–Suhl–Schweinfurt–Würzburg Hbf (every 120 minutes)
STB 4 Erfurt Hbf–Arnstadt Hbf–Plaue–Suhl–Meiningen (every 120 minutes)
EIB 3 Erfurt Hbf–Arnstadt Hbf–Ilmenau (every 60 minutes)

The EIB 3 and STB 4 services run from Erfurt to Plaue are coupled and are separated at the station. The STB and EIB services are operated with Stadler Regio-Shuttle diesel railcar and the RE service is operated with Bombardier RegioSwinger diesel multiple units.

The station was built in 1879 when the railway line from Arnstadt to Ilmenau was built. The Würzburg line was added in 1884. The station was restored in 2005 during the development of the Erfurt–Würzburg railway for 140 km/h and tilting technology. The station building was privatised in 2012 and has been reused as a student residence with 20 apartments.

Platforms

References

Railway stations in Thuringia
Railway stations in Germany opened in 1879
Buildings and structures in Ilm-Kreis